Epristeride, sold under the brand names Aipuliete and Chuanliu, is a medication which is used in the treatment of enlarged prostate in China. It is taken by mouth.

Epristeride is a 5α-reductase inhibitor and works by decreasing the production of dihydrotestosterone (DHT), an androgen sex hormone, in certain parts of the body like the prostate gland. It inhibits two of the three forms of 5α-reductase but is of relatively low efficacy and can decrease DHT levels in the blood only by about 25 to 54%.

Epristeride was under development for the treatment of enlarged prostate, scalp hair loss, and acne in the United States and other countries in the 1990s but did not complete development in these countries. Instead, it was developed and introduced for the treatment of enlarged prostate in China in 2000.

Medical uses
Epristeride is used in the treatment of benign prostatic hyperplasia (BPH), otherwise known as enlarged prostate.

Pharmacology

Pharmacodynamics
Epristeride is a selective, transition-state, non-competitive or uncompetitive, irreversible inhibitor of 5α-reductase, and is specific to the type II isoform of the enzyme similarly to finasteride and turosteride but unlike dutasteride.

Epristeride is unique in its mechanism of action relative to finasteride and dutasteride in that it binds irreversibly to 5α-reductase and results in the formation of an unproductive complex of the 5α-reductase enzyme, the substrate testosterone, and the cofactor NADPH. For this reason, testosterone is caught in a trap, and it was initially speculated that the reciprocal increase in intraprostatic levels of testosterone seen with finasteride and dutasteride should not happen with epristeride. However, subsequent clinical data have not supported this hypothesis. Moreover, in spite of the fact that epristeride is a very potent inhibitor of 5α-reductase type II (0.18–2 nM), it has been found to reduce circulating levels of dihydrotestosterone (DHT) by only 25 to 54% following 8 days of therapy over a dosage range of 0.4 to 160 mg/day. For this reason, relative to other 5α-reductase inhibitors like finasteride and dutasteride, the degree of DHT suppression with epristeride falls short of that desirable for full clinical benefit.

Pharmacokinetics
The oral bioavailability of epristeride is 93%. It has an elimination half-life of 26 hours.

Chemistry

Epristeride, also known as 17β-(tert-butylcarbamoyl)androsta-3,5-diene-3-carboxylic acid, is a synthetic androstane steroid.

History
Epristeride was under development for the treatment of BPH, androgenic alopecia (pattern hair loss), and acne vulgaris by SmithKline Beecham (now GlaxoSmithKline) in the 1990s and reached phase III clinical trials in the United States, United Kingdom, and Japan, but ultimately was never marketed in these countries. Instead, epristeride was developed by Ono Pharmaceutical and introduced for the treatment of BPH in China in 2000.

Society and culture

Generic names

Brand names
Epristeride is marketed under the brand names Aipuliete and Chuanliu in China.

References

External links
 Epristeride - AdisInsight

5α-Reductase inhibitors
Androstanes
Carbamates
Carboxylic acids
Conjugated dienes
Enones
Tert-butyl compounds